Herald is the second studio album by Australian musician Odette, released on 5 February 2021 through EMI Music Australia.

Supported by the singles "Feverbreak", "Dwell", and "Amends" and "Trial by Fire"—Herald debuted and peaked at number 47 on the ARIA Albums Chart.

At the 2021 ARIA Music Awards, the album was nominated for Best Adult Contemporary Album and Best Blues & Roots Album and Eben Ejdne was nominated for Best Cover Art for this release.

Background
The album follows on three years after Odette's debut album, To a Stranger (2018), which received high critical acclaim and two ARIA Awards nominations in the year of release.

Discussing the album in a press release, Odette stated: "This album is sort of a nuanced discussion of the positives and the negatives of mental illness and also just being a human being. It talks about the realities of hurting others, the consequences of that, and even more so, it holds me accountable—it holds me to my word."

Recording
Odette collaborated with producer Damian Taylor during recording sessions, who previously produced her debut album.

Composition
The album as a whole discusses themes of transitioning from adolescence to adulthood, and mental health, whilst "Dwell" is "anchored in Odette's own  reflections on grief and the manifestations of emotional negativity."

In an interview with Triple J, Odette described the album as focussed sonically around "a classic scale with electronic elements."

Release
Heralds title and release date were announced on 20 October 2020.

The album was released on 5 February 2021 on CD, LP, digital download, and streaming formats. A bone-coloured edition of the vinyl was also made available exclusively at Australian JB Hi-Fi stores.

Promotion

Singles
Herald was supported by four singles.

"Feverbreak", a collaboration with Hermitude, was released as the album's lead single on 14 February 2020.

"Dwell" was released as the second single on 20 October 2020.

"Amends" was released as the third single on 8 January 2021.

"Trial by Fire" was serviced to Australian contemporary hit radio as the album's fourth and final single on 14 May 2021.

Live performances
On 15 November 2020, Odette performed "Dwell" live for Australian live music program The Sound.

On 19 November 2020, Odette performed "Dwell" live on Triple J's Like a Version segment, alongside a cover of AC/DC's "Thunderstruck".

Critical reception
{{Album ratings
| rev1 = Exclaim!
| rev1score = 
| rev2 = The Music
| rev2score =  
}}Herald received favourable reviews from music critics.Exclaim!s Urbi Khan labelled it a "coming-of-age album". Khan felt that "[Odette] sheds her past self and creates the new out of the ashes".

Guido Farnell from The Music'' was positive in his review of the album, noting "there is great poetic intent driving her somewhat lovelorn lyrical observations."

Mid-year lists

Track listing

Personnel
Musicians
 Odette – vocals (all tracks), programming (1, 4, 8), piano (3, 10)
 Damian Taylor – programming (1, 3, 4, 8)
 Jasper Leak – bass (3)
 Martin Mackerras – clarinet (3, 10), saxophone (3)
 Kelly Pratt – alto saxophone, baritone saxophone, clarinet, flugelhorn, flute, French horn, trumpet (4, 8)
 Tam Altmann – accordion (10)

Technical
 Damian Taylor – production, mixing
 Heba Kadry – mastering
 Rohan Sfornica – engineering assistance (3, 10)
 Chris Mclaughlin – engineering assistance (5, 6, 9, 11)

Charts

References

2021 albums
Odette (musician) albums
Albums produced by Damian Taylor